The Sulston score is an equation used in DNA mapping to numerically assess the likelihood that a given "fingerprint" similarity between two DNA clones is merely a result of chance. Used as such, it is a test of statistical significance. That is, low values imply that similarity is significant, suggesting that two DNA clones overlap one another and that the given similarity is not just a chance event. The name is an eponym that refers to John Sulston by virtue of his being the lead author of the paper that first proposed the equation's use.

The overlap problem in mapping 

Each clone in a DNA mapping project has a "fingerprint", i.e. a set of DNA fragment lengths inferred from (1) enzymatically digesting the clone, (2) separating these fragments on a gel, and (3) estimating their lengths based on gel location. For each pairwise clone comparison, one can establish how many lengths from each set match-up. Cases having at least 1 match indicate that the clones might overlap because matches may represent the same DNA. However, the underlying sequences for each match are not known. Consequently, two fragments whose lengths match may still represent different sequences. In other words, matches do not conclusively indicate overlaps. The problem is instead one of using matches to probabilistically classify overlap status.

Mathematical scores in overlap assessment 

Biologists have used a variety of means (often in combination) to discern clone overlaps in DNA mapping projects. While many are biological, i.e. looking for shared markers, others are basically mathematical, usually adopting probabilistic and/or statistical approaches.

Sulston score exposition 

The Sulston score is rooted in the concepts of Bernoulli and binomial processes, as follows. That is, clone  has at least as many fragments as clone , but usually more. Intuitively, we see that, at most, there can be  matches. Thus, for a given comparison between two clones, one can measure the statistical significance of a match of  fragments, i.e. how likely it is that this match occurred simply as a result of random chance. Very low values would indicate a significant match that is highly unlikely to have arisen by pure chance, while higher values would suggest that the given match could be just a coincidence.

{| class="toccolours collapsible collapsed" width="60%" style="text-align:left"
!Derivation of the Sulston Score
|-
|One of the basic assumptions is that fragments are uniformly distributed on a gel, i.e. a fragment has an equal likelihood of appearing anywhere on the gel. Since gel position is an indicator of fragment length, this assumption is equivalent to presuming that the fragment lengths are uniformly distributed.

In what follows, let us refer to individual fragment lengths simply as lengths. Consider a specific length  on clone  and a specific length  on clone . We assume that the gel location of fragment  has been determined and we want
Since fragment  could occur anywhere in the gel of length , we have . The probability that  does not match  is simply the complement, i.e. , since it must either match or not match.

Now, let us expand this to compute the probability that no length on clone  matches the single particular length  on clone . This is simply the intersection of all individual trials  where the event  occurs, i.e. . This can be restated verbally as: length 1 on clone  does not match length  on clone  and length 2 does not match length  and length 3 does not match, etc. Since each of these trials is assumed to be independent, the probability is simply

Of course, the actual event of interest is the complement: i.e. there is not "no matches". Formally,  is the probability that at least one band on clone  matches band  on clone .

However, we want to describe the process over all the bands on clone . Since  is constant, the number of matches is distributed binomially. Given  observed matches, the Sulston score is simply the probability of obtaining at least  matches by chance according to

where  are binomial coefficients.
|}

Mathematical refinement

In a 2005 paper, Michael Wendl gave an example showing that the assumption of independent trials is not valid. So, although the traditional Sulston score does indeed represent a probability distribution, it is not actually the distribution characteristic of the fingerprint problem. Wendl went on to give the general solution for this problem in terms of the Bell polynomials, showing the traditional score overpredicts P-values by orders of magnitude. (P-values are very small in this problem, so we are talking, for example, about probabilities on the order of 10×10−14 versus 10×10−12, the latter Sulston value being 2 orders of magnitude too high.) This solution provides a basis for determining when a problem has sufficient information content to be treated by the probabilistic approach and is also a general solution to the birthday problem of 2 types.

A disadvantage of the exact solution is that its evaluation is computationally intensive and, in fact, is not feasible for comparing large clones. Some fast approximations for this problem have been proposed.

References

See also
FPC: a widely used fingerprint mapping program that utilizes the Sulston Score

Bioinformatics
Mathematical and theoretical biology